San Antonio de los Cobres is a small town of population 5,482 (per the 2001 INDEC census)   in northwestern Argentina. It is the capital of the Los Andes Department of the Salta Province.

Geography
It is part of the Andes desert and described to be an arid region with few trees and scarce drinking water.

History
In a 2015 podcast from The Naked Scientists, research has shown that people in the San Antonio de los Cobres area have remarkably developed a mutation in their genes to cope with the high levels of arsenic in the area. Having concentrations about ten times higher that those deemed safe by the World Health Organization (WHO), naturally occurring arsenic has created a very toxic environment in this region contaminating the water supplies. Evolutionary processes resulting from long term exposure have caused a specific mutation within the DNA of this population allowing them to process arsenic more quickly throughout their systems and preventing the formation of poisonous byproducts that would normally form within the body with exposure to the element. This is the first adaptation in humans regarding a toxic chemical to ever be documented.

Economy
San Antonio de las Cobres takes its name from the nearby Sierra de Cobre, or Copper Mountain, which is rich in that mineral. Economic activity in the town is based on mining of the mineral-rich surrounding mountains, and weaving using local llama wool.
The town is also a stop along the Tren a las Nubes (Train of the Clouds), on the Salta-Antofagasta rail line.

Climate
San Antonio de los Cobres has a cool arid climate (Köppen BWk) characterised by mild summers, cold, bone-dry winters, and very large diurnal temperature variation due to the extreme altitude. Rainfall is essentially nil except from January to March, when  of an annual total of  falls from thunderstorms.

Gallery

References

External links

Populated places in Salta Province
Cities in Argentina
Salta Province
Argentina